Diptychophora kuhlweinii is a moth in the family Crambidae. It was described by Zeller in 1866. It is found in Brazil (Rio de Janeiro).

References

Diptychophorini
Moths described in 1866